Quo primum (from the first) is the incipit of an Apostolic constitution in the form of a papal bull issued by Pope Pius V on 14 July 1570. It promulgated the Roman Missal, and made its use obligatory throughout the Latin Church of the Catholic Church, except where there existed a different Mass liturgy of the Latin Church of at least two hundred years standing.

The declared reason for this measure was this: "It is most becoming that there be in the Church... only one rite for the celebration of Mass." However, he made the exception mentioned, which permitted the survival, within limited areas or in celebrations by members of certain religious orders, of Latin liturgical rites other than the Roman Rite, rites such as the Ambrosian and Mozarabic Rites, that of the Diocese of Lyon and certain Catholic Order Rites. Some of these dioceses and religious orders have since decided to adopt the Roman Rite. Others preferred not to avail themselves of the exemption to which they were entitled and instead to adopt the Roman Missal immediately.

Thus, although the bull Quo primum contained expressions such as "Let all everywhere adopt and observe what has been handed down by the Holy Roman Church, the Mother and Teacher of the other Churches, and let Masses not be sung or read according to any other formula than that of this Missal published by Us. This ordinance applies henceforth, now, and forever, throughout all the provinces of the Christian world", exceptions were allowed from the start, and not all priests—even those within Latin Rites—were obliged to adopt the Missal of Pius V.

In the bull Pope Pius V declared: "By this present Constitution, which will be valid henceforth, now, and forever, We order and enjoin that nothing must be added to Our recently published Missal, nothing omitted from it, nor anything whatsoever be changed within it." And he concluded: "No one whosoever is permitted to alter this notice of Our permission, statute, ordinance, command, precept, grant, indult, declaration, will, decree, and prohibition. Should anyone dare to contravene it, let him know that he will incur the wrath of Almighty God and of the Blessed Apostles Peter and Paul."

By this, he forbade alterations by other authorities, ecclesiastical or civil, or by private individuals. He gives a list of ecclesiastical dignitaries who, he says, may not alter his Missal, even of the level of cardinal, or another ("each and every patriarch, administrator, and all other persons or whatever ecclesiastical dignity they may be, be they even cardinals of the Holy Roman Church, or possessed of any other rank or pre-eminence"). Paul V instituted a minor inclusion of a Feast day after the victory of Lepanto in the following year, he added to it the feast of Our Lady of Victory. In 1585, Pope Sixtus V restored the feast of the Presentation of the Virgin Mary, which Pope Pius V had removed from the Missal. Only 34 years after the publication of Quo primum, Pope Clement VIII made a general revision of the Roman Missal, as did Pope Urban VIII 30 years later. These additions of Feast days and revision were not an abrogation of Quo Primum, but rather, within its purview, and affirmations of, its theological underpinnings.

See also
Council of Trent
Tridentine Mass
Pre-Tridentine Mass
Mass of Paul VI
Roman Missal
Mass (liturgy)

References

External links
 Translation of Quo Primum
 Text of Quo Primum
 Bilingual version of Quo Primum

Apostolic constitutions
Tridentine Mass
1570 works
Documents of Pope Pius V